Nacif Elias (born 29 September 1988) is a Brazilian-born Lebanese judoka.

Career
Elias competed at the 2016 Summer Olympics in the 81 kg event, in which he was eliminated in the second round, in his first match, by Emmanuel Lucenti. He was the flagbearer for Lebanon during the opening ceremonies of the 2014 Asian Games and 2016 Olympics.

Personal life
Elias was born in Brazil, but his great-grandfather was Lebanese. In 2013 he changed nationality to represent Lebanon, while staying in Brazil. In order to compete for Lebanon, Elias had been invited to become a Lebanese citizen. "It was a tough call," he said, but the offer he received from the Lebanese Judo Federation made it hard to refuse. "Lebanon offered to pay me to enter eight competitions per year, whereas the Brazilian national team would pay for three or four at most," he said. 

Elias is married and has one son.

References

External links

 
 
 

1988 births
Living people
Lebanese male judoka
Olympic judoka of Lebanon
Judoka at the 2016 Summer Olympics
Asian Games medalists in judo
Judoka at the 2014 Asian Games
Judoka at the 2018 Asian Games
Asian Games silver medalists for Lebanon
Medalists at the 2014 Asian Games
Kurash practitioners at the 2018 Asian Games
Sambo practitioners at the 2018 Asian Games
Competitors at the 2018 Mediterranean Games
Judoka at the 2020 Summer Olympics